George Strahan may refer to:
 George Strahan (colonial administrator), British military officer and colonial administrator
 George Strahan (publisher), Scottish bookseller and publisher
 George Strahan (engineer), British army engineer